The 1999 NCAA Division I Cross Country Championships were the 61st annual NCAA Men's Division I Cross Country Championship and the 19th annual NCAA Women's Division I Cross Country Championship to determine the team and individual national champions of NCAA Division I men's and women's collegiate cross country running in the United States. In all, four different titles were contested: men's and women's individual and team championships.

Held on November 22, 1999, the combined meet was hosted by Indiana University in Bloomington, Indiana. The distance for the men's race was 10 kilometers (6.21 miles) while the distance for the women's race was 5 kilometers (3.11 miles). 

The men's team championship was won by Arkansas (58 points), the Razorbacks' second consecutive and eighth overall. The women's team championship was won by BYU (72 points), the Cougars' second title (and second in three years).

The two individual champions were, for the men, David Kimani (South Alabama, 30:06.6) and, for the women, Erica Palmer (Wisconsin, 16:39.5).

Men's title
Distance: 10,000 meters

Men's Team Result (Top 10)

Men's Individual Result (Top 10)

Women's title
Distance: 5,000 meters

Women's Team Result (Top 10)

Women's Individual Result (Top 10)

References
 

NCAA Cross Country Championships
NCAA Division I Cross Country Championships
NCAA Division I Cross Country Championships
NCAA Division I Cross Country Championships
Track and field in Indiana
Bloomington, Indiana
Indiana University